Alfréd Jindra (31 March 1930 – 7 May 2006) was a Czechoslovak sprint canoer who competed for Czechoslovakia in the early 1950s. He won a bronze medal in the C-1 10000 m event at the 1952 Summer Olympics in Helsinki. Jindra was born and died in Prague.

References

External links
 
 
 

1930 births
2006 deaths
Canoeists at the 1952 Summer Olympics
Czechoslovak male canoeists
Czech male canoeists
Olympic canoeists of Czechoslovakia
Olympic bronze medalists for Czechoslovakia
Olympic medalists in canoeing
Medalists at the 1952 Summer Olympics
Canoeists from Prague